Retronecine is a pyrrolizidine alkaloid found in a variety of plants in the genera Senecio and Crotalaria, and the family Boraginaceae.  It is the most common central core for other pyrrolizidine alkaloids.

References

Pyrrolizidine alkaloids